The first season of the American streaming television series Daredevil, which is based on the Marvel Comics character of the same name, follows the early days of Matt Murdock / Daredevil, a lawyer-by-day who fights crime at night, juxtaposed with the rise of crime lord Wilson Fisk. It is set in the Marvel Cinematic Universe (MCU), sharing continuity with the films and other television series of the franchise. The season was produced by Marvel Television in association with ABC Studios, DeKnight Prods. and Goddard Textiles, with Steven S. DeKnight serving as showrunner, and series creator Drew Goddard acting as consultant.

Charlie Cox stars as Murdock, while Vincent D'Onofrio plays Fisk. They are joined by principal cast members Deborah Ann Woll, Elden Henson, Toby Leonard Moore, Vondie Curtis-Hall, Bob Gunton, Ayelet Zurer, and Rosario Dawson. Daredevil entered development in late 2013, with Goddard hired in December. DeKnight replaced him as showrunner and Cox was hired to star in May 2014. Filmed in New York City from July to December 2014, the season focuses on the darker, more mature elements of the source material. Stephanie Maslansky designed the costumes for the season, with the final red suit for Daredevil designed by Ryan Meinerding and the costume artists at Marvel Studios. The season features links and references to other MCU projects, including future Netflix series.

The first two episodes of the season premiered in Los Angeles on April 2, 2015, with the full season of 13 episodes released on Netflix on April 10 to an estimated high viewership. Critics praised the performances, particularly D'Onofrio's, and the darker tone and action sequences of the series compared to other properties set in the MCU. However, some of the pacing during the season and the final red Daredevil suit received criticism. The first season received two nominations for Creative Emmy Awards, for the visual effects from Shade VFX, and the sound editing. The series was renewed for a second season on April 21, 2015.

Episodes

Cast and characters

Main
 Charlie Cox as Matt Murdock / Daredevil
 Deborah Ann Woll as Karen Page
 Elden Henson as Franklin "Foggy" Nelson
 Toby Leonard Moore as James Wesley
 Vondie Curtis-Hall as Ben Urich
 Bob Gunton as Leland Owlsley
 Ayelet Zurer as Vanessa Marianna
 Rosario Dawson as Claire Temple
 Vincent D'Onofrio as Wilson Fisk

Recurring
 Peter McRobbie as Paul Lantom
 Rob Morgan as Turk Barrett
 Royce Johnson as Brett Mahoney
 Daryl Edwards as Carl Hoffman
 Chris Tardio as Christian Blake
 Wai Ching Ho as Gao
 Peter Shinkoda as Nobu Yoshioka

 Nikolai Nikolaeff as Vladimir Ranskahov
 Susan Varon as Josie
 Geoffrey Cantor as Mitchell Ellison
 Adriane Lenox as Doris Urich
 Judith Delgado as Elena Cardenas
 Amy Rutberg as Marci Stahl
 Tom Walker as Francis

Production

Development
In October 2013, Marvel and Disney announced that Marvel Television and ABC Studios would provide Netflix with live action series centered around Daredevil, Jessica Jones, Iron Fist, and Luke Cage, leading up to a miniseries based on the Defenders. Drew Goddard was hired to serve as executive producer and showrunner for Daredevil, however, in May 2014 it was announced that Goddard had stepped down as showrunner in order to focus on directing a feature film based on Marvel's Sinister Six for Sony Pictures Entertainment. He was succeeded by Steven S. DeKnight. Goddard, who wrote the first two episodes, remained with the show as a consultant and executive producer. It was also revealed that the series would be titled Marvel's Daredevil. The first season consists of 13 hour-long episodes, and DeKnight, Goddard, Jeph Loeb, Jim Chory, Dan Buckley, Joe Quesada, Stan Lee, Alan Fine, Cindy Holland, Kris Henigman, Allie Goss, and Peter Friedlander serve as executive producers.

Writing
The season does not directly adapt any one storyline from the comics, with DeKnight feeling that it was more important to focus on "nailing the spirit of the comics". He stated that Netflix's support of "the creatives" coupled with Marvel's restrictions on their properties led to him pushing the source material as far as he could while remaining respectful of the characters and their history, and being surprised at "how willing everyone is to take a really fresh look and really push what we're doing." Vincent D'Onofrio compared telling a story on Netflix to more of a "13-hour film" than a television series and noted that time can be taken to tell the story and "be much more specific". Deborah Ann Woll explained that what she saw as one of the most important themes in the series was normal people having an impact in "seemingly insurmountable circumstances", with the focus not being on Daredevil's abilities or the characters' qualifications, but on their willingness to help people.

Though the season was much more violent than previous Marvel Cinematic Universe (MCU) works, DeKnight felt that sexual violence would be "too far", saying that "Daredevil wasn't asking for a lot of sexual situations, especially since Matt Murdock is not really in the position to get into a relationship, and it just didn't fit the story for that season. I think that'll change moving forward, but I never pushed any kind of sexual agenda on the show. I think once Daredevil was a hit and people were really responding positively, you can see the progression into more of an adult world in Jessica Jones."

Speaking about the way the season reveals the name Daredevil, DeKnight explained that several options had been brought up, such as "one of the versions in the comics where when he was a kid people used to taunt him with the name Daredevil", which did not fit in the world of the series, or having Ben Urich give the character the name, but the timing for that did not work due to Urich's death before the final Daredevil suit was introduced. It was decided that instead of having the name Daredevil said onscreen, it would be easier to introduce it through the media as a newspaper headline. On why this was not done for Wilson Fisk as Kingpin, DeKnight stated that he felt it would "get a little bit silly....[if] we went, 'Oh they called him Daredevil! Oh they called him Kingpin!'," and was unable to come up with another natural way for the name Kingpin to come up, so it was decided to leave that for a later time.

Casting
The main cast for the season includes Charlie Cox as Matt Murdock / Daredevil, Deborah Ann Woll as Karen Page, Elden Henson as Franklin "Foggy" Nelson, Toby Leonard Moore as James Wesley, Vondie Curtis-Hall as Ben Urich, Bob Gunton as Leland Owlsley, Ayelet Zurer as Vanessa Marianna, Rosario Dawson as Claire Temple, and Vincent D'Onofrio as Wilson Fisk. 

In July 2014, Peter Shinkoda was reported to have a recurring role in the season, portraying Hashiro. In March 2015, this character was revealed to actually be Nobu Yoshioka, while recurring opponents for Daredevil – Madame Gao, Vladimir Ranskahov, and Turk Barrett – were also announced, portrayed by Wai Ching Ho, Nikolai Nikolaeff, and Rob Morgan. Additionally, the following also recur throughout the season: Geoffrey Cantor as Mitchell Ellison; Judith Delgado as Elena Cardenas; Daryl Edwards as Carl Hoffman; Royce Johnson as Brett Mahoney; Adriane Lenox as Doris Urich; Peter McRobbie as Father Paul Lantom; Amy Rutberg as Marci Stahl; Chris Tardio as Christian Blake; Susan Varon as Josie; and Tom Walker as Francis.

Design

Costume designer Stephanie Maslansky read the first two episodes' scripts and some outlines of future scripts, and developed a "solid understanding" of the character arcs and overall story to begin the advanced planning needed for costume design. She also asked questions to prepare for character's stunt requirements and the building or retro-fitting of more complex costumes.

Murdock begins the season wearing a black costume (called the "vigilante outfit" by production), inspired by the one worn by the character in Frank Miller's The Man Without Fear, rather than the more traditional red, horned suit. This was done to highlight the formation of Matt Murdock as Daredevil, with the costume evolving over time as the character develops. Marvel Comics' Chief Creative Officer Quesada conceptualized the look based on DeKnight's specifications. On the design process, DeKnight revealed that "we tried practically everything, design-wise. We experimented with a lot of different head pieces. One version was a ski mask with the eyes sewn shut. We tried everything until we found something that just felt right." DeKnight and Quesada explained that the idea was for Murdock to start out with a homemade outfit that fits more in the "real-world" of the series, and to then evolve it into the classic Daredevil suit. Maslansky noted that they wanted the outfit to "look like something that Matt Murdock could put together himself, that he could either order off the Internet or shop around town....we wound up with pretty practical choices for him. His shirts are compression shirts and his pants wound up being from an army/navy store." Concerning the black mask, Maslansky noted that a balance between aesthetic and safety was required, and that it was made of layers of cotton mesh that "really conform to his head" but also allowed Cox to see through the mask.

On the red suit, Maslansky said, "We wanted something that looked militaristic and functional, but also dramatic and sexy" adding that it was "tricky" making it practical. To begin the process of creating the suit, Quesada contacted Ryan Meinerding and the costume artists and design team at Marvel Studios, who all contributed design ideas, with one of Meinerding's ultimately being picked. Quesada, who previously worked as an artist on Daredevil comics, gave several suggestions, including the incorporation of some of how New York was created into the suit, which led to the use of rivets and "architectural" shapes. The suit is intended to look like a Kevlar vest, and the black sections are an homage to comic panels where the artists highlighted certain areas with red, with "deeper portions" in shadow. On the mask, Meinerding noted the difficulty in designing the entire top half of a face that is intended to match the bottom half of an actor's face, "because half of his face has to be covered and has its own expression and the actor's face is going to be doing something else". For the billy clubs used by Daredevil in the series, which were designed by Andy Park, discussions were had about having them holstered on the right leg, given that both Cox and his stunt double Chris Brewster are right handed, but it was ultimately decided to have the holster on the left hand side as it is in the "classic profile" of the comics. DeKnight explained that Murdock's Daredevil suit does not have the "DD" emblem on the chest as seen in the comics, because Murdock receives his moniker only after the suit is introduced. He also felt that the emblem was "one of the more problematic emblems in superhero-dom", and that Daredevil's suit in the comics was "very difficult to translate to screen, especially in this world that is grounded and gritty".

Many of the male characters in the series are often seen wearing suits, which Maslansky was comfortable with after working as the costume designer on White Collar. Murdock's suits are differentiated more by texture than color, with a limited palette, given that the character cannot see what color his clothing is. Cox's size changed throughout the series as he continued to work out. For Murdock's sunglasses, Maslansky worked with series prop master Michael Jortner to make something that fit into the modern world, but paid homage to "what was familiar to fans". Close to 100 different versions of the prop were created for Cox to try. For the women of the series, Maslansky looked to their backstories in the show, with Page having dreams and fantasies of a life in New York along the lines of Katharine Hepburn and Lauren Bacall, and dressing according to those thoughts ("retro, slim skirts, tighter fitting tops and slim dresses"), while Marianna coming into the series as a mysterious yet glamorous femme fatale, dressing in high-end, couture clothing; "she needed to appeal to [Fisk]. He wouldn't go for just any chick in a pair of old jeans and a t-shirt."

Filming
In February 2014, Marvel announced that Daredevil would be filmed in New York City. In April 2014, Quesada reiterated this, stating that the show would be filming in areas of Brooklyn and Long Island City that still look like the old Hell's Kitchen, in addition to sound stage work. Loeb said that Daredevil would begin filming in July 2014, and DeKnight confirmed that filming had started that month. It filmed under the working title Bluff, on a $56 million budget. The production received $14.3 million under the New York Film & TV Tax Credit Program. Production concluded on December 21, 2014. Other filming locations in New York City included the Williamsburg, Greenpoint and Bushwick neighborhoods in Brooklyn; Abe Lebewohl Park in the East Village; Whitestone Lanes bowling alley in Flushing, Queens; the New York State Supreme Court Building, with the interior for court scenes filmed on a set; Brooklyn Borough Hall; the Rockefeller Center rooftop gardens; Brooklyn College for Murdock and Nelson's flashback to their time in college; the Chelsea neighborhood in Manhattan; and the Honeywell Bridge in Long Island City.

"Cut Man" ends with a long action sequence filmed in a single take. DeKnight called it the "most complicated action scene" in the series, due to the technical difficulty in filming it, and credited Goddard, episodic director Phil Abraham, stunt coordinator Philip J Silvera, and series cinematographer Matt Lloyd with realizing it. He also named The Raid films as inspiration for the sequence. There were only a few days to plan and set up the fight, as opposed to a film which would allow "at least a couple of weeks", and it took 7 or 8 takes to get the shot right. Silvera explained that the scene was always scripted to be a one-shot, and that he had intended to work around it with wipes, but Abraham challenged the team to do it all for real, which allowed the fight to feel more grounded by having them "slow down the fight, and just have this raw, animalistic feeling happening." The final shot does include some 'Texas Switches' between actors and stunt doubles, but was ultimately filmed with no cuts.

Talking about the scene where Fisk beheads Anatoly Ranskahov with a car door in "In the Blood", DeKnight noted that series like Spartacus and The Walking Dead would have shown the head being crushed, which he felt was "the right choice" for them, but for Daredevil "we did very much a Psycho thing, we saw the aftereffects of it, but you never saw the car door crushing his head....Sound effects, absolutely. It's a very disturbing scene without crossing that line into a horror movie kind of deal."

Visual effects
Visual effects for the series were completed by the New York studio Shade VFX; Daredevil featured over 1000 visual effect shots. Executive visual effects supervisor Bryan Goswin explained that the company's work included the creation of digital doubles when stunts were not safe for actors or stunt doubles, as well as blood-hits and wounds, with "a lot of support to the idea of the violence and gore that happens in Daredevil" given to differentiate the series from other Marvel projects, and to try to set the series in a "more realistic and dark place, the real streets of New York."

One shot created by Shade VFX is when the audience sees Matt Murdock's "vision" – the way that he "sees" using his other heightened senses. On why this was only used once in the season, DeKnight explained that it had in fact been budgeted to appear several more times, with the effect actually completed at least twice more for the season. It was removed for several reasons, including to avoid taking away the specialty of it, and to maintain the crime drama tone of the series. One instance where it would have been used again was in "Stick", where the audience would have seen how Murdock saw Stick as he threw keys at him, and then when he is older and Stick throws fighting sticks at him and his senses are more refined. In that case, the effect was not finished on time. Another instance was in "The Ones We Leave Behind" when Murdock comes across a Chinese worker and realizes that he has been blinded. The final use of the effect was going to be in "Daredevil" when the camera pushes in on Page's reaction Murdock telling her that they can work together. Here, the effect was hiding all of the nuances in her expression, so it was decided that it would be better to remove it.

Music
Composer John Paesano was brought on "a couple of weeks in to post-production", and scored an episode every four to five days. Paesano estimated that each episode has around 25–30 minutes of music in it. In approaching the series' score, Paesano looked to DeKnight, who "had a very clear vision of what he wanted ... music you could feel and not necessarily hear." The result was a more minimalist score than typical "superhero" music, although the music starts to "change color" and move closer to that of the MCU when the classic red costume is introduced. Most of the score was produced electronically, though live elements, such as a cello, were used where possible. Rather than "keep the drive and the energy up" with drums, Paesano elected to use a low pulsing heartbeat that was inline with the series' minimalist approach, and tied into the fact that Daredevil can hear people's heartbeats in the show. A soundtrack album for the season was released digitally by Hollywood Records on April 27, 2015.

All music composed by John Paesano, unless otherwise noted.

Marvel Cinematic Universe tie-ins
In February 2015, Emma Fleisher of Marvel Television stated that Daredevil takes place in the aftermath of The Avengers (2012), but would not "explicitly [be] in that Agents of S.H.I.E.L.D. world. We're in our own corner [of the MCU]. So the aliens came down and ruined the city, and this is the story of Hell's Kitchen's rebuild." Connections to other MCU properties include the character of Carl "Crusher" Creel, who appears in Agents of S.H.I.E.L.D. portrayed by Brian Patrick Wade, and is mentioned as having fought Jack Murdock in the latter's final boxing match; St. Agnes Orphanage, where both Matt Murdock and Agents of S.H.I.E.L.D.s Skye are raised; the insignia on Madame Gao's heroin, which is a connection to the Iron Fist antagonist Steel Serpent; and mentions of Roxxon Oil, a company featured throughout the MCU.

The final scene of "Stick", featuring a conversation between Stick and Stone, was meant to hint at further ties between the series and other areas of the MCU in the same way as Marvel's film post-credits scenes, though it could not actually go after the episode's credits due to the way that Netflix begins the next episode during the credits of the current one. There were discussions about having another such "coda" at the end of the season finale, one which would have featured Leland Owlsley attempting to escape New York, only to be killed by the Punisher in a surprise introduction. The scene would not have shown the actor's face, but would have included the character's iconic skull insignia. The idea was dropped, again because of Netflix's playing system, and Owlsley was ultimately killed by Fisk in the episode, with the introduction of the Punisher saved for the series' second season.

Marketing
At the October 2014 New York Comic Con, footage from the series was shown. In January 2015, a motion film poster was released to coincide with the revealing of the streaming date for the first season. The following month, on February 4, a teaser trailer was released. Merrill Barr of Forbes noted the dark tone of the trailer in a similar vein to DC Comics' Arrow and different from Marvel's ABC series, but questioned the timing of the trailer debut after Super Bowl XLIX, especially as the company did not air trailers during the event for Avengers: Age of Ultron or Ant-Man and could have benefited from introducing "its latest and riskiest show" to general audiences through it. In March 2015, an additional motion poster was released, which featured all major characters and Avengers Tower in the background of the poster, as well as the possible reveal of Murdock's red suit in his reflection. In the lead up to the first-season premiere, a street marketing campaign appeared across the world in 12 cities with various artists creating murals. On April 2, 2015, the series had its premiere at the Regal Premiere House at L.A. Live where the first two episodes were previewed.

Release

Streaming
The first season of Daredevil was released on April 10, 2015 on the streaming service Netflix, in all territories where it is available, in Ultra HD 4K. On April 14, 2015, Daredevil was the first Netflix series to receive its Descriptive Video Service audio description track, "a narration track that describes what is happening on-screen, including physical actions, facial expressions, costumes, settings and scene changes." By April 16, episodes for the series had been pirated by 2.1 million individual users worldwide, according to Excipio, a piracy tracking firm, surpassed in that timeframe only by Game of Thrones. The biggest countries for piracy were Brazil (190,274 torrent downloaders), India (149,316), the U.S. (144,351), the UK (119,891), France (105,473) and Australia (101,025). Except for India, Netflix was available in each of those countries at the time. The season was enhanced to be available in high dynamic range after its initial release by post-production vendor Deluxe.

The season, along with the additional Daredevil seasons and the other Marvel Netflix series, was removed from Netflix on March 1, 2022, due to Netflix's license for the series ending and Disney regaining the rights. The season became available on Disney+ in the United States, Canada, United Kingdom, Ireland, Australia, and New Zealand on March 16, ahead of its debut in Disney+'s other markets by the end of 2022.

Home media
The season was released on DVD in Region 2 and Blu-ray in Region B on October 3, 2016, in Region 1 and Region A on November 8, 2016, and in Region 4 on December 7, 2016.

Reception

Audience viewership
As Netflix does not reveal subscriber viewership numbers for any of their original series, Luth Research compiled data for the season, based on a sample of 2,500 Netflix subscribers watching via computers, tablets or smartphones. (Luth Research does not track Netflix viewing on televisions, whether Internet-connected sets or those linked to streaming-media players or gaming consoles.) According to Luth, an estimated 10.7% of subscribers (approximately 4.4 million) watched at least one episode of Daredevil in its first 11 days on Netflix, with 2.3% (940,000) watching on the first day. In a separate study, Netflix determined that the fifth episode of the season was the one to "hook" viewers, "to the point where they [continued on to watch] the entire first season."

Critical response

The review aggregator website Rotten Tomatoes reported a 99% approval rating with an average rating of 8.1/10 based on 72 reviews. The website's critical consensus reads, "With tight adherence to its source material's history, high production quality, and a no-nonsense dramatic flair, Daredevil excels as an effective superhero origin story, a gritty procedural, and an exciting action adventure." Metacritic, which uses a weighted average, assigned a score of 75 out of 100, based on 22 critics, indicating "generally favorable reviews".

In reviews for the first five episodes of the series, Brian Lowry of Variety felt that "Compared to Marvel's experience with Agents of S.H.I.E.L.D. for ABC, operating in Netflix's pay-to-view world is clearly liberating" in terms of what can be done and shown. Matt Patches of Esquire added, "The show's exterior recasts the high fructose, splash page aesthetic of Iron Man, Thor, Captain America with neo-noir attitude. Goddard and DeKnight drench Daredevil in shadows and blood." He compared Daredevil to "a TV spinoff" of Christopher Nolans Batman films, and praised Cox and D'Onofrio's portrayals, while criticizing a subplot involving Nelson and Page and noting that the slow pacing of Daredevil, in which story may be stretched out more than needs be, could be a problem for binge-watchers. Victoria McNally of MTV felt the early episodes' fight sequences were "filmed beautifully" and enjoyed that they featured little CGI, while also calling Henson "perfectly cast and endlessly amusing" as Nelson.

Eric Eisenberg of Cinema Blend also had positive thoughts on the initial episodes, saying, "It's smart, entertaining, and has moments so shocking that you'll have to repress screams. Suffice it to say, Marvel and Netflix have another big winner on their respective plates," while also praising the acting. Speaking of the first two episodes, Mark Hughes of Forbes added additional praise, saying, "Quite simply, in Daredevil Marvel delivers one of the greatest live-action superhero origin stories ever made. It is in the same top-tier category of true superhero origin films along with Batman Begins, Iron Man, and Superman: The Movie." Hughes stated that if the first two episodes were released in theaters with only minor tweaks, they "would've been hailed as one of Marvel's best films to date". Mike Hale at The New York Times was less positive about the series, calling it ordinary, but admitting having high expectations due to his love for the comics, and admiring the care and seriousness with which the series was made. He called the series pace "leisurely", but "a pleasant change from the norm", and called Cox's performance "divided", praising him as Murdock and criticizing him as Daredevil. Hale was positive about the cast overall, and ultimately surmised that after seeing the first five episodes, Daredevil is "eminently watchable", but not the Daredevil he remembered from the comics.

After reviewing each of the individual episodes, IGN reviewer Matt Fowler gave the entire first season a score of 9 out of 10, indicating an "Amazing" season, saying that though it may have "spun a few wheels" while building up to its endgame, the series was "a thrilling, ultra-satisfying take on Daredevil's material and lore. One that, like Favreau's first Iron Man film, helped breathe new life and fandom into a somewhat B-tier Marvel character." He particularly praised D'Onofrio's performance, the "edgy" fight sequences, the fact that the hero himself got "beat on – a lot", and the unique dark take on the MCU. Liz Shannon Miller, reviewing the season for Indiewire, graded it a 'B+', and though feeling that it didn't quite live up to DeKnight's admitted influence, The Wire, praised the series, noting its characters and development, and the performances of the entire cast, especially those of D'Onofrio, Curtis-Hall, and Cox. She was positive about the level of violence the series depicted, and all of its "brutal" and "beautiful" fight sequences, as well as the way that the series explores the consequences for average people of events from the films, while committing to building its own universe within the already established MCU. Alan Sepinwall of HitFix also praised the cast and characters, particularly D'Onofrio, and felt that series benefited from having a much narrower focus than the Marvel films or other series. He did wish that Murdock's "world on fire"-sight was used more often, and felt that the classic Daredevil costume, which "may not translate well to live-action", could use "some tweaks".

Accolades
Cox was honored at the American Foundation for the Blind's 19th Annual Helen Keller Achievement Awards, for those "that have demonstrated outstanding achievement in improving quality of life for people with vision loss." The series' main title sequence, created initially for this season, won the Online Film & Television Association's award for the Best New Titles Sequence, and was nominated for the Creative Arts Emmy Award for Outstanding Main Title Design, which went to Manhattan.

The season was included on multiple Best/Top TV Shows of 2015 lists, ranking on Peoples (1st, along with Jessica Jones), Business Insiders (3rd), TV Guide and Digital Spy's (7th), and Slate Magazines (23rd). It also was included on Vanity Fair Best New TV Shows of 2015 list. Daredevils first season was the seventh trending television show search on Google for 2015.

Notes

References

External links
 
 

2015 American television seasons
01
Works about Irish-American organized crime